Riberas is one of five parishes (administrative divisions) in Soto del Barco, a municipality within the province and autonomous community of Asturias, in northern Spain. The journalist and ambassador Luis Amado-Blanco Fernandez was born here in 1903. 

The postal code is 33127.

Villages and hamlets
La Barrera 
La Bernadal 
La Carretera 
Carrocero 
Cotollano 
La Llamera 
Monterrey 
Las Rabias 
Riberas 
Santa Eulalia 
El Truébano
Ucedo 
Los Veneros 
La Quintanona 
La Bimera

References

Parishes in Soto del Barco